Elections to Amber Valley Borough Council in Derbyshire, England took place on Thursday 3 May 2012. One third of the council was up for election and the Conservative Party held overall control of the council. Overall turnout in this election was 33.28 per cent.

After the election, the composition of the council was:
 Conservative 24
 Labour       21

Election result

Ward results

References

 

2012 English local elections
2012
2010s in Derbyshire